General elections will be held in Brazil on 4 October 2026 to elect the president, vice president, members of the National Congress, the governors, vice governors, and legislative assemblies of all federative units, and the district council of Fernando de Noronha. If no candidate for president—or for governor in some states—received more than half of the valid votes in the first round, a runoff election for these offices will be held on 31 October. 

Incumbent left-wing president Luiz Inácio Lula da Silva of the Workers' Party is eligible for a fourth term. Having run for president in 1989, 1994, 1998, he was elected in 2002 and re-elected in 2006. He was then succeeded by his Chief of Staff Dilma Rousseff, who was elected in 2010 and re-elected in 2014. Lula attempted to run for the presidency for a third-non consecutive term in 2018, but his candidacy was denied by the Superior Electoral Court due to his previous conviction on corruption charges in 2017. A series of court rulings led to his release from prison in 2019, followed by the annulment of his conviction and restoration of his political rights by 2021. For his vice presidential candidate in the 2022 election, Lula selected Geraldo Alckmin, who had been a presidential candidate of the Brazilian Social Democracy Party in 2006 (facing Luiz Inácio Lula da Silva in the second round) and 2018 but changed his affiliation to the Brazilian Socialist Party in 2022.

Lula won the 2022 election by the closest margin in Brazilian history 50.90% to 49.10% against incumbent right-wing president Jair Bolsonaro. Lula, re-re-elected in 2022, became the first person to secure a third presidential term, receiving the highest number of votes in a Brazilian election. At the same time, Bolsonaro, elected in 2018, became the first incumbent president to lose a bid for a second term since a 1997 constitutional amendment allowing consecutive re-election. In response to his loss, some Bolsonaro supporters demanded a military coup to prevent Lula's inauguration, but failed to gather sufficient support. Before Lula's inauguration, Bolsonaro left the country for the United States but remains eligible for a second term.

Background 
From 1994 to 2014, presidential elections in Brazil were dominated by candidates of the centrist Brazilian Social Democracy Party and the left-wing Workers' Party. After unsuccessful attempts in the 1989, 1994, and 1998 presidential elections, Workers' Party candidate Luiz Inácio Lula da Silva was elected in the 2002 and 2006 presidential elections. His successor from the same party, Dilma Rousseff, was elected in the 2010 and 2014 presidential elections. The controversial 2016 impeachment of Rousseff removed her from office due to administrative misconduct, and she was succeeded by her vice president, Michel Temer of the centrist Brazilian Democratic Movement. In 2017, Operation Car Wash controversially resulted in Lula being convicted on charges of corruption by judge Sergio Moro and arrested, which prevented his intended candidacy in the 2018 Brazilian presidential election, despite his substantial lead in the polls. He was replaced as his party's presidential candidate by former mayor of São Paulo, Fernando Haddad, who lost to far-right candidate Jair Bolsonaro of the Social Liberal Party.

In 2019, Bolsonaro left the Social Liberal Party. This was followed by the dismissal or resignation of many members of the Bolsonaro administration, including Moro, whom he had appointed as Minister of Justice and Public Safety. Bolsonaro then attempted to create another party, the Alliance for Brazil, but he was unsuccessful. In 2021, Bolsonaro joined the Liberal Party and selected Walter Braga Netto of his party as the vice presidential candidate instead of Hamilton Mourão, the incumbent vice president. A series of rulings by the Supreme Federal Court questioning the legality of Lula's trial and the impartiality of then judge Moro led to Lula's release from prison in 2019, followed by the annulment of Moro's cases against Lula and the restoration of Lula's political rights by 2021. Lula launched his candidacy for president in 2022, selecting as his vice presidential candidate Geraldo Alckmin, who had been a presidential candidate of the Brazilian Social Democracy Party in 2006 and 2018 but changed his affiliation to the left-wing Brazilian Socialist Party in 2022. The three parties supporting Bolsonaro in 2022 (Liberal Party, Progressistas, and Republicans) had supported Alckmin in 2018 and Rousseff in 2014. After Bolsonaro's departure from the Social Liberal Party, the party merged with the Democrats to form the Brazil Union in 2022.

Electoral system 

Brazil's president and vice president are elected as a joint ticket using the two-round system. The first round of elections is held on the first Sunday of October, which in 2022 was on 2 October. A candidate who receives more than 50% of the total valid votes in the first round is elected. If the 50% threshold is not met by any candidate, the two candidates who receive the most votes in the first round participate in a second round of voting, held on the last Sunday of October (in this instance, 30 October 2022), and the candidate who receives a plurality of votes in the second round is elected. The 2022 Brazilian gubernatorial elections to elect the governors and vice governors of all states of Brazil and of the Federal District were held on the same dates and with the same two-round system as the presidential election. One-third of the 81 members of the Brazilian Senate were up for election in 2022, one senator being elected from each of the states and the Federal District using plurality voting. The other two-thirds of the Senate were elected in 2018.

All 513 members of the Chamber of Deputies (federal deputies) are elected from 27 multi-member constituencies corresponding to the states and the Federal District, varying in size from 8 to 70 seats. All members of the Legislative Assemblies of Brazilian states (state deputies) and of the Legislative Chamber of the Federal District (district deputies), varying in size from 24 to 94 seats, are also elected. These elections are held using open list, proportional representation, with seats allocated using integer quotients and the D'Hondt method. All seven members of the District Council of Fernando de Noronha are elected by single non-transferable vote. Unlike elections for other offices in Brazil, candidates for this council are not nominated by political parties.

Voters 

Voting in Brazil is allowed for all citizens over 16 years old. There is compulsory voting for literate citizens between 18 and 70 years old except conscripts; as there is conscription in Brazil, those who serve the mandatory military service are not allowed to vote. Those who are required but do not vote in an election and do not present an acceptable justification, such as being absent from their voting locality at the time, must pay a fine, normally R$3.51, which is equivalent to US$0.67 as of October 2022. In some cases, the fine may be waived, reduced, or increased up to R$35.13 (US$6.67).

The Brazilian diaspora may only vote for president and vice president. Due to the Equality Statute between Brazil and Portugal, Portuguese citizens legally residing in Brazil for more than three years may also register to vote in Brazilian elections.

Candidates and political parties 

All candidates for federal, state, Federal District, and municipal offices must be nominated by a political party. For offices to be elected by majority or plurality (executive offices and senators), parties may form an electoral coalition (coligação) to nominate a single candidate. The coalitions do not need to be composed of the same parties for every nomination, do not need to be maintained after the election, and are not valid for offices to be elected proportionally (deputies and aldermen). A new law, valid for this election, also allowed parties to form a different type of alliance called federation (federação), which acts as a single party to nominate candidates for all offices in all locations, including those to be elected proportionally, and must be maintained with a single leadership structure over the course of the elected legislature. Federations may also act as parties to form coalitions. For 2022, the federations formed were Brazil of Hope (PT–PCdoB–PV), Always Forward (PSDB–Cidadania), and the PSOL REDE Federation (PSOL–REDE).

For offices to be elected proportionally, each party must nominate candidates of each sex in a distribution between 30 and 70%. Under rulings by the Superior Electoral Court and the Supreme Federal Court, parties must also allocate their funds and broadcast time proportionally to the number of their candidates of each sex and race.

Procedure 

Voting in Brazilian elections can only be done in person and only on election day, which is always a Sunday. There is no provision for either postal voting or early voting. Voter registration must be done in advance, and each voter can only vote in one designated voting station, either based on the voter's registered domicile or at a different location that the voter must specifically request if planning to be there temporarily on election day. Voters must provide photo identification at their voting station before proceeding to vote.

More than 92,000 voting stations were installed in all municipalities of Brazil, the Federal District, and Fernando de Noronha. Most voting stations are in public schools. In some sparsely populated areas, such as indigenous territories, the installation and use of voting stations requires extensive travel and logistics. Voting stations were also installed in 160 locations in other countries, mostly in Brazilian diplomatic missions, for citizens residing abroad.

Voting is done almost entirely on DRE voting machines, designed for extreme simplicity. The voter dials a number corresponding to the desired candidate or party, causing the name and photo of the candidate or party to appear on the screen, then the voter presses a green button to confirm or an orange button to correct and try again. It is also possible to leave the vote blank by pressing a white button, or to nullify the vote by dialing a number that does not correspond to any candidate or party. Paper ballots are only used in case a voting machine malfunctions or in locations abroad with fewer than 100 voters.

The electronic system is subject to extensive tests, including on machines randomly selected from actual voting stations on election day, witnessed by political parties to rule out fraud. After voting ends, every machine prints a record of its total votes for each candidate or party, which is publicly displayed for comparison with the results published electronically. The system delivers the complete election results usually a few hours after voting ends, which is extremely fast for such a large population as Brazil. At the same time, the system does not create a physical record of individual votes to allow a full election recount.

The partial vote count for an office can only start being published after voting has ended in all locations in Brazil voting for that office, to avoid influencing those still voting. Due to time zones in Brazil, in previous years the vote count for president (the only one that combines votes from more than one state) could only start being published after voting ended in UTC−05:00, two hours after it had ended for the vast majority of the population in UTC−03:00. To avoid this undesirable wait, the Superior Electoral Court ordered for 2022 that voting stations were to operate at the same time in the whole country, regardless of their time zone: 9:00 to 18:00 UTC−02:00, 8:00 to 17:00 UTC−03:00, 7:00 to 16:00 UTC−04:00, and 6:00 to 15:00 UTC−05:00. Politicians from the state of Acre (UTC−05:00) filed a legal complaint against this order due to the unreasonably early start of voting preparations in their local time; the complaint was dismissed by the Supreme Federal Court. The unified voting time does not apply to voting stations for citizens abroad, which still operate from 8:00 to 17:00 local time, even though some of them end up to four hours after UTC−03:00. The same is expected to remain for 2026.

Candidates for President

Declared Candidates

Independent 

 Danilo Gentili, comedian, writer, and political commentator

Publicly expressed interest 
As of January 2023, the following notable individuals have expressed an interest in running for president within the previous six months.

NOVO 

 Romeu Zema, businessman, administrator, and Governor of Minas Gerias since 2019

Liberal Party 

 Jair Bolsonaro, retired military officer, Federal Deputy for Rio de Janeiro (1991-2018), and President of Brazil from 2019-2022

Brazil Union 

 Ronaldo Caiado, orthopedic physician, former candidate for President of Brazil in 1989, former Federal Deputy for Goiás ( 1991-1995,1999-2015), former Senator for Goiás (2015-2019), and current Governor of Goiás (2019-present)

Independent 
 Luciano Huck, TV host and presenter

Potential candidates 
As of January 2023, there has been speculation about the potential candidacy of the following notable individuals within the previous six months.

Brazilian Democratic Movement 

 Simone Tebet, professor, former Senator for Mato Grosso do Sul (2015-2023), candidate for president in 2022, and current Minister of Planning

Brazilian Social Democracy Party 

 Eduardo Leite, former Mayor of Pelotas, pre-candidate for President of Brazil in 2022, and Governor of Rio Grande do Sul (2019-2022, 2023-present)
 Raquel Lyra, lawyer, former mayor of Caruaru (2017-2022), and Governor of Pernambuco (2023-present)
 Eduardo Riedel, businessman, former director of the National Confederation of Agricultural Workers, and Governor of Mato Grosso do Sul (2023-present)

Brazilian Socialist Party 

 Geraldo Alckmin, anesthesiologist, former Governor of São Paulo (2001-2006, 2011-2018), candidate for President of Brazil in 2006 and 2018, current Minister of Development, Industry and Foreign Trade and Vice President of Brazil
 Márcio França, lawyer, former Federal Deputy for São Paulo (2007-2014), former Governor of São Paulo (2018), and current Minister of Ports and Airports
 Flávio Dino, lawyer, former federal judge, former president of Embratur (2011-2014), former Governor of Maranhão (2015-2022), and current Minister of Justice and Public Security

Liberal Party 

 Cláudio Castro, lawyer, former member of the Municipal Chamber of Rio de Janeiro (2017-2019), and Governor of Rio de Janeiro (2021-present)

Republicanos 

 Tarcísio de Freitas, engineer, former Minister of Infrastructure (2019-2022), and Governor of São Paulo (2023-present)
 Hamilton Mourão, former general, former Vice-President of Brazil (2019-2022), and Senator for Rio Grande do Sul (2023-present)

Sustainability Network 

 Marina Silva, environmentalist, former Senator for Acre (1995-2003, 2008-2011), candidate for president in 2010, 2014, and 2018, Federal Deputy for São Paulo (2023-present), and Minister of the Environment (2003-2008, 2023-present)

Social Democratic Party 

 Gilberto Kassab, businessman, founder of the PSD, former Mayor of São Paulo (2006-2012), former Minister of Cities (2015-2016), former Minister of Science (2016-2018), and current State Secretary of Government of São Paulo (2023-present)

Socialism and Liberty Party 

 Guilherme Boulos, writer, activist, member of the National Coordination for the Homeless Workers Movement, candidate for President of Brazil in 2018, candidate for Mayor of São Paulo in 2020, and Federal Deputy from São Paulo (2023-present)

Brazil Union 

 Sergio Moro, former federal judge, leader of the Lavo Jato investigation, and Senator for Paraná (2023-present)

Workers' Party 

 Luiz Inácio Lula da Silva, trade unionist, former metalworker, and President of Brazil (2003-2010, 2023 to present) 
 Gleisi Hoffmann, lawyer, former Senator for Paraná (2014-2019), Federal Deputy for Paraná (2019-present), and National President of the Workers' Party (2017-present)
 Fernando Haddad, academic, former Minister of Education (2005-2012), former Mayor of São Paulo (2013-2016), candidate for president in 2018, and current Minister of Finance
 Wellington Dias, bank clerk, writer, former Senator for Piauí (2011-2015), former Governor of Piauí (2003-2010, 2015-2022), and current Minister of Social Development (2023-present)
 Camilo Santana, agricultural engineer, former Governor of Ceará (2015-2022), current Minister of Education (2023-present)

Declined to be candidates 
The following notable individuals have been the subject of speculation about their possible candidacy, but have publicly denied interest in running

Liberal Party 

 Michelle Bolsonaro, former First Lady of Brazil and wife of Jair Bolsonaro

See also 

 2018 Brazilian general election
 2022 Brazilian general election
 Pink tide
 Bolsonarismo

References

Brazil
Presidential elections in Brazil